Montaure is a former commune in the Eure department in Normandy in northern France. On 1 January 2017, it was merged into the new commune Terres de Bord.

Population

See also
Communes of the Eure department

References

Former communes of Eure